Feira may refer to:

Feira (constituency), a parliamentary constituency in Zambia
Feira (Santa Maria da Feira), a former civil parish in Portugal
Luangwa, Zambia, a town in Zambia formerly known as Feira